Zaretsky is a surname. Notable people with the surname include:

 Alexandra Zaretsky (born 1987), Israeli ice dancer
 Roman Zaretsky (born 1983), Israeli ice dancer, brother of Alexandra

See also
 Zaritsky